Rest Energy may refer to:
Rest energy, concept in particle physics
Rest Energy (performance piece)